Arriba gente (Spanish: Wake Up People) is an Uruguayan morning television show that is broadcast on Channel 10 since February 8, 2010. The program airs Monday through Friday from 8:00 a.m. to 10:30 a.m. Journalistic topics are treated. In addition, there are interviews and musical performances.

History 
The program debuted on Monday, February 8, 2010. At the beginning it was presented by Humberto de Vargas, Ignacio Martirené and Gabriela Lavarello. Danilo Tegaldo served as a reporter. In mid-2010, months after the premiere of the program, de Vargas was absent for two months to shoot 3, a film which he starred in.

On-air staff

Current 

Humberto de Vargas (Co-Anchor; 2010–present)
 Danilo Tegaldo (Co-Anchor; 2015–present)
 Lorena Bomio (Co-Anchor; 2017–present)
 Verónica Chevalier (Announcer; 2014–present)
 Magdalena Correa (Reporter; 2017–present)

Former on-air staff 

 Ignacio Martirené (Co-Anchor; 2010–2014) 
 Gabriela Lavarello (Co-Anchor; 2010–2015)
 María José Pino (Reporter; 2015–2017)

References 

Uruguayan television series
2010 Uruguayan television series debuts
2010s Uruguayan television series
Uruguayan television shows
Uruguayan television news programmes
Canal 10 (Uruguay) original programming